Alberto Terrones (1894–1957) was an Argentine film and theater actor, with an extensive filmography.

Filmography
 Mercado de abasto (1955)
 Misión extravagante (1954)
 Barrio gris (1954)
 Una ventana a la vida (1953)
 Misión en Buenos Aires (1952)
 The Beautiful Brummel (1951)
 El último payador (1950)
 Mary tuvo la culpa (1950)
 Avivato (1949)
 Al marido hay que seguirlo (1948)
 Don Bildigerno de Pago Milagro (1948)
 Novio, marido y amante (1948)
 La Secta del trébol (1948) 
 El que recibe las bofetadas (1947)
 El retrato (1947)
 Viaje sin regreso (1946)
 Un modelo de París (1946)
 María Celeste (1945)
 El muerto falta a la cita (1944)
 Los dos rivales (1944)
 Su esposa diurna (1944)
 His Best Student (1944)
 La piel de zapa (1943)
 Eclipse de sol (1943)
 Pasión imposible (1943)
 La suerte llama tres veces (1943)
 Los hijos artificiales (1943)
 Mar del Plata ida y vuelta (1942)
 Ceniza al viento (1942)
 Ven... mi corazón te llama (1942)
 El Gran secreto (1942)
 Elvira Fernández, vendedora de tiendas (1942)
 Una novia en apuros (1942)
 Bruma en el Riachuelo (1942)
 Vidas marcadas (1942)
 Story of a Poor Young Man (1942)
 Mother Gloria (1941)
 Persona honrada se necesita (1941)
 When the Heart Sings (1941)
 El mejor papá del mundo (1941)
 La quinta calumnia (1941)
 Último refugio (1941)
 Yo hablo... (1940)
 La carga de los valientes (1940)
 Caprichosa y millonaria (1940)
 Encadenado (1940)
 Corazón de turco (1940)
 Sinvergüenza (1940)
 El grito de la juventud (1939)
 Muchachas que estudian (1939)
 The Life of Carlos Gardel (1939)
 Retazo (1939)
 La modelo y la estrella (1939)
 La vida es un tango (1939)
 El gran camarada (1939)
 El viejo doctor (1939)
 Atorrante (La venganza de la tierra) (1939)
 Nativa (1939)
 Honeysuckle (1938)
 Kilómetro 111 (1938)
 Nace un amor (1938)
 Con las alas rotas (1938)
 La rubia del camino (1938)
 El escuadrón azul (1938)
 El gran camarada (1938)

References

External links
  Alberto Terrones in Internet Movie Data Base

1894 births
1957 deaths
Argentine male film actors
20th-century Argentine male actors